Abadeh Tashk (also Romanized as Ābādeh Ţashk, Ābādeh-ye Ţashk, Ābādeh-i-Tashk, and Ābādeh-ye Ţashk; also known as Ţashk and Ābādī-ye Tashk) is a city and capital of Bakhtegan County, Fars Province, Iran.  At the 2006 census, its population was 6,213 in 1,614 families.

References

{Bakhtegan County}}

Populated places in Abadeh Tashk County
Cities in Fars Province